Davide Cimolai (born 13 August 1989) is an Italian professional road and track bicycle racer, who currently rides for UCI WorldTeam .

Career
Born in Pordenone, Cimolai has competed as a professional since the 2010 season, competing for the  team until the end of 2011, when he joined the  squad for the 2012 season. Cimolai made his Grand Tour début at the 2012 Vuelta a España, where he was the  team's main sprinter in a climber-stacked squad; he finished inside the top ten of a stage for the first time, when he placed seventh on the second stage.

Cimolai's first two professional wins came in 2015. He won the Italian Trofeo Laigueglia classic, then, a month later, won the fifth stage of Paris–Nice. In May 2019, he was named in the startlist for the 2019 Giro d'Italia.

Major results

2005
 2nd Time trial, National Novice Road Championships
2007
 1st Giro Ciclistico della Bassa Friulana
 1st Gran Premio Ormesani
 1st Medaglia d'oro Sportivi Castione
 1st Giro della Romagna
 1st GP R.E.M. Crema
 1st Giro Delle Conche
 1st Trofeo Orogildo
 National Junior Track Championships
2nd Individual pursuit
2nd Points race
2008
 1st Piccolo Giro d'Emilia
 1st Tre Giorni Citta di Pordenone
 2nd UIV CUP Fiorenzuola
 3rd  Team pursuit, UEC European Under-23 Track Championships 
2009
 1st Coppa San Geo
 1st Trofeo Franco Balestra
 1st Trofeo Banca Popolare di Vicenza
 2nd Trofeo Marco Rusconi
 2nd Medaglia d'Oro Fiera di Sommacampagna
 3rd Medaglia d'Oro Frare De Nardi
 3rd Memorial Danilo Furlan
 3rd La Popolarissima
 4th Giro Nazionale del Valdarno
 5th Circuito Internazionale di Caneva
 5th GP De Nardi
 7th Trofeo Edil C
2010
 1st Stage 1b (TTT) Settimana Internazionale di Coppi e Bartali
 4th Circuito de Getxo
 9th GP Industria & Artigianato di Larciano
2011
 UEC European Under-23 Track Championships
1st  Scratch
2nd  Madison
 National Track Championships
1st  Scratch
1st  Madison
2nd Team pursuit
 6th GP Kranj
2012
 9th Overall Giro della Provincia di Reggio Calabria
2013
 3rd Trofeo Platja de Muro
 4th Grand Prix de Fourmies
 5th Brussels Cycling Classic
2014
 7th Vattenfall Cyclassics
2015
 1st Trofeo Laigueglia
 1st Stage 5 Paris–Nice
 8th Milan–San Remo
2016
 1st Stage 6 Volta a Catalunya
 1st Stage 2 Tour of Japan
2017
 1st Stage 1 Volta a Catalunya
 5th La Roue Tourangelle
2018
 5th Road race, UEC European Road Championships
 6th Paris–Camembert
2019
 1st  Overall Vuelta a Castilla y León
1st  Points classification
1st Stages 1 & 2
 1st Stage 3 Tour de Wallonie
 4th Eschborn–Frankfurt
 6th Coppa Sabatini
 10th Trofeo Laigueglia

Grand Tour general classification results timeline

References

External links
Lampre-ISD profile

Italian male cyclists
1989 births
Living people
People from Pordenone
Cyclists from Friuli Venezia Giulia